Yulia Yosephine Susanto (born 19 October 1993) is an Indonesian badminton player. She reach her first final at the Iran Fajr International but lost to Tasnim Mir.

Achievements

BWF International Challenge/Series (1 title, 1 runner-up) 
Women's singles

  BWF International Challenge tournament
  BWF International Series tournament
  BWF Future Series tournament

Performance timeline

National team 
 Junior level

Individual competitions

Junior level 
 Girls' singles

Senior level

Women's singles

Women's doubles

Mixed doubles

References

External links 
 

1993 births
Living people
People from Tasikmalaya
Indonesian female badminton players
21st-century Indonesian women